The 1999 Women's National Invitation Tournament was a single-elimination tournament of 32 NCAA Division I teams that were not selected to participate in the 1999 Women's NCAA tournament. It was the second edition of the postseason Women's National Invitation Tournament (WNIT). The tournament was expanded from 16 teams in 1998 to 32 teams.

The final four of the tournament paired the Wisconsin Badgers against the Memphis Tigers with the Arkansas Razorbacks facing the Drake Bulldogs. Wisconsin beat Memphis 92–73 and Arkansas beat Drake 80–66.

Bracket
Games marked signify overtime.

North bracket

Midwest bracket

West bracket

South bracket

Semifinals and championship game

All-tournament team
 Sytia Messer, Arkansas
 Lonniya Bragg, Arkansas (MVP)
 LaTonya Sims, Wisconsin
 Tamara Moore, Wisconsin
 Tammi Blackstone, Drake
 Tamika Whitmore, Memphis

Source:

See also
1999 NCAA Division I women's basketball tournament

References

Women's National Invitation Tournament
Women's National Invitation Tournament
1998–99 NCAA Division I women's basketball season
1999 in sports in Arkansas